SPEARpesticides (Species At Risk) is a trait based biological indicator system for streams which quantitatively links pesticide contamination to the composition of invertebrate communities. The approach uses species traits that characterize the ecological requirements posed by pesticide contamination in running waters. Therefore, it is highly specific and only slightly influenced by other environmental factors. SPEARpesticides is linked to the quality classes of the EU Water Framework Directive (WFD)

History
SPEARpesticides has been first developed for Central Germany and updated. SPEARpesticides was adapted and validated for streams and mesocosms worldwide and provides the first ecotoxicological approach to specifically determine the ecological effects of pesticides on aquatic invertebrate communities. Denmark, Finland, France, Germany, Switzerland 
Australia
Russia
Mesocosms

Calculation

SPEARpesticides estimates pesticide effects and contamination. The calculation is based on monitoring data of invertebrate communities as ascertained for the EU Water Framework Directive (WFD). A simplified version of SPEARpesticides is included in the ASTERICS software for assessing the ecological quality of rivers. A detailed analysis is enabled by the free SPEAR Calculator. The SPEAR Calculator provides most recent information on species traits and allows specific user settings. 
The SPEARpesticides index is computed as relative abundance of vulnerable 'SPecies At Risk' (SPEAR) to be affected by pesticides. Relevant species traits comprises the physiological sensitivity towards pesticides, generation time, migration ability and exposure probability. The indicator value of SPEARpesticides at a sampling site is calculated as follows:

with n = number of taxa; xi = abundance of taxon i; y = 1 if taxon i is classified as SPEAR-sensitive; y = 0 if taxon i is classified as SPEAR-insensitive.

An application is available as download for PC. Web address to download the SPEAR calculator

References

Bioindicators
Water quality indicators
Pesticides
Water pollution